The 1944 Boston Yanks season was its inaugural season in the National Football League. The team won two games and failed to qualify for the playoffs.

1944

Standings

References

1944
Boston Yanks
Boston